Aberthin Platform  railway station was a short lived Taff Vale Railway station which served Aberthin, a village north east of Cowbridge in the Welsh county of Glamorganshire.

History

Opened by the Taff Vale Railway it only operated for fifteen years. It was one of four stations (all 'platforms') opened on the Cowbridge branch in 1905 in an attempt to develop new traffic on the line. Like the other three 'platforms', Aberthin Platform was a single bare platform, about forty feet in length and was without any form of shelter. It was located about half a mile from the village and was reached by a footpath over the fields.

The site today

The site is now in a field to the west of the village where a track crosses formation of the old railway.

References 

Disused railway stations in the Vale of Glamorgan
Former Taff Vale Railway stations
Railway stations in Great Britain opened in 1905
Railway stations in Great Britain closed in 1920